Léo Joseph Paul Westermann (born 24 July 1992) is a French professional basketball player for Monbus Obradoiro of the Spanish Liga ACB. He also represents the senior French national basketball team.

Early years
Westermann started his men's club career in 2008, playing for Centre Fédéral de Basketball, in the Nationale Masculine 1, the third division of French basketball. He played for Centre Fed for two seasons, averaging 10.1 points, 2.6 assists, and 1.1 steals per game, in 48 games played.

Personal life
He is a big fan of KK Partizan.

Professional career

ASVEL
Westermann signed with the French club ASVEL Basket, in 2010. He stayed there for two seasons, playing in the top-tier level French Pro A and in the European-wide 2nd-tier level EuroCup. In 2012, Westermann was selected to play for the World Team at the Nike Hoop Summit in Portland, Oregon. He left the team just a few hours before he signed a contract with a different team.

Partizan
On 2 July 2012, it was reported that Westermann had signed a three-year contract with Serbian club Partizan Belgrade. With Partizan was one of the candidates for the prestigious EuroLeague Rising Star award, which eventually went to Kostas Papanikolaou. In his first season, he averaged 9.6 points, 2.6 rebounds, and 4.1 assists per game in the EuroLeague. In the ABA League season, Westermann helped his team to win the title, averaging 6.9 points, 2.5 rebounds, and 2.2 assists per game, in 28 games. In November's EuroLeague away game against CSKA Moscow, he tore his ACL on his knee, which sidelined him for the remainder of the season. As a result of the injury, Partizan had to find a replacement for him in Milenko Tepić, a former member of the team.

Barcelona / Limoges 
On 17 July 2014, Spanish club FC Barcelona acquired the player rights of Westermann. On 25 July 2014, he was loaned by Barcelona to the French EuroLeague team Limoges CSP, for one season. Over 10 EuroLeague season games, he averaged 7.7 points, 2.3 rebounds, a career-high 4.3 assists, and 1.3 steal per game. On 11 July 2015, Westermann signed a one-year extension, with the option of another year, with Limoges.

Žalgiris Kaunas
On 30 May 2016, Westermann signed a one-year contract, with the possibility to extend it for one more year, with the Lithuanian club Žalgiris Kaunas. Over 30 EuroLeague season games, he averaged 8.2 points, 3.2 rebounds, 5.5 assists, and 0.5 steals per game.

CSKA Moscow
On 22 June 2017, the Russian club CSKA Moscow, announced the signing of Westermann, to a 1+1 (2nd year being optional) year contract. On 16 July 2018, Westermann was officially released from CSKA.

Return to Žalgiris Kaunas
Westermann returned and signed with Žalgiris Kaunas on 23 September 2018.

Fenerbahçe
On 12 July 2019, Westermann signed a two-year deal with Fenerbahçe of the Turkish Basketball League. On 22 December 2020, he was released by Fenerbahçe.

Barcelona
On 22 December 2020, Westermann signed as a free-agent with EuroLeague powerhouse FC Barcelona of the Liga ACB.

AS Monaco
On 29 July 2021, Westermann signed a one-year deal with EuroCup champions AS Monaco Basket of the French LNB Pro A and the EuroLeague.

Monbus Obradoiro
On 5 August 2022, Westermann signed a one-year deal with Monbus Obradoiro of the Liga ACB.

Career statistics

EuroLeague

|-
| style="text-align:left;"| 2012–13
| style="text-align:left;" rowspan=2| Partizan
| 9 || 7 || 28.9 || .392 || .433 || .846 || 2.6 || 4.1 || .3 || .0 || 9.6 || 6.6
|-
| style="text-align:left;"| 2013–14
| 5 || 5 || 27.1 || .344 || .385 || 1.000 || 1.4 || 2.2 || .4 || .0 || 7.0 || 3.8
|-
| style="text-align:left;"| 2014–15
| style="text-align:left;" rowspan=2| Limoges
| 10 || 10 || 23.4 || .370 || .368 || .900 || 2.3 || 4.3 || 1.7 || .1 || 7.7 || 8.3
|-
| style="text-align:left;"| 2015–16
| 10 || 10 || 27.3 || .468 || .344 || .889 || 2.8 || 4.3 || 1.1 || .1 || 10.1 || 10.7
|-
| style="text-align:left;"| 2016–17
| style="text-align:left;"| Žalgiris
| 30 || 27|| 25.3 || .425 || .344 || .886 || 3.2 || 5.5 || .5 || .0 || 8.2 || 10.0
|-
| style="text-align:left;"| 2017–18
| style="text-align:left;"| CSKA Moscow
| 17 || 4 || 13.5 || .362 || .325 || 1.000 || 1.2 || 1.9 || .4 || .1 || 4.6 || 4.0
|-
| style="text-align:left;"| 2018–19
| style="text-align:left;"| Žalgiris
| 27 || 11 || 17.3 || .398 || .420 || .744 || 2.0 || 2.8 || .6 || .0 || 6.4 || 5.9
|-
| style="text-align:left;"| 2019–20
| style="text-align:left;"| Fenerbahçe
| 22 || 10 || 11.9 || .439 || .477 || .714 || 1.6 || 1.8 || .4 || .0 || 3.8 || 3.4
|-
| style="text-align:left;" rowspan=2| 2020–21
| style="text-align:left;"| Fenerbahçe
| 9 || 3 || 12.6 || .444 || .450 || 1.000 || 1.7 || 2.3 || .6 || .0 || 4.8 || 4.0
|-
| style="text-align:left;"| Barcelona
| 15 || 1 || 11.0 || .351 || .308 || .778 || 1.4 || 1.8 || .3 || .0 || 2.7 || 2.9
|-
| style="text-align:left;"| 2021–22
| style="text-align:left;"| Monaco
| 22 || 14 || 16.7 || .352 || .316 || .885 || 1.5 || 2.5 || .3 || .1 || 4.8 || 4.1
|- class="sortbottom"
| colspan=2 align=center | Career
| 176 || 102 || 18.5 || .401 || .376 || .859 || 2.0 || 3.1 || .5 || .0 || 6.1 || 5.9

National team career

French junior national team
As a player of France's junior teams, Westermann won a silver medal at the 2009 FIBA Europe Under-18 Championship. Westermann also played at the 2011 FIBA Europe Under-20 Championship, where he helped France to win a bronze medal. At the 2012 FIBA Europe Under-20 Championship, Westermann won the silver medal, and was named the tournament's MVP.

French senior national team
Westermann was on the senior French national basketball team's candidate list to compete at the EuroBasket 2013. However, unlike his teammate in Partizan Belgrade, Joffrey Lauvergne, he did not make it onto France's final 12-man squad for the tournament. He played with France at EuroBasket 2015, where he won a bronze medal.

He also played at EuroBasket 2017.

References

External links

Léo Westermann at eurobasket.com
Léo Westermann at euroleague.net (archive)
Léo Westermann at euroleaguebasketball.net
Léo Westermann  at draftexpress.com
Léo Westermann at fiba.com
Léo Westermann at fiba.com (game center)
Léo Westermann at lnb.fr 
Léo Westermann at proballers.com

1992 births
Living people
ABA League players
Alsatian people
AS Monaco Basket players
ASVEL Basket players
Basketball League of Serbia players
BC Žalgiris players
FC Barcelona Bàsquet players
Expatriate basketball people in Lithuania
Fenerbahçe men's basketball players
French expatriate basketball people in Russia
French expatriate basketball people in Serbia
French expatriate basketball people in Spain
French expatriate basketball people in Turkey
French expatriate sportspeople in Lithuania
French men's basketball players
KK Partizan players
Liga ACB players
Limoges CSP players
Obradoiro CAB players
PBC CSKA Moscow players
People from Haguenau
Point guards
Sportspeople from Bas-Rhin